Saranjam may refer to:
Saranjam, a grant of land ruled by a Saranjamdar among the former Maratha occupied regions of India
Bhoite Saranjam, a political saranjam in the Bombay Presidency.
Kalâm-e Saranjâm, (کلام سرانجام) "The Discourse of Conclusion", the central religious text of the Ahl-e Haqq in Kurdish literature